Sherwood Park—Fort Saskatchewan is a federal electoral district in Alberta, Canada, that has been represented in the House of Commons of Canada since 2015.

Sherwood Park—Fort Saskatchewan was created by the 2012 federal electoral boundaries redistribution and was legally defined in the 2013 representation order. It came into effect upon the call of the 42nd Canadian federal election. It was created out of parts of Edmonton—Sherwood Park and Vegreville—Wainwright.

Demographics
According to the Canada 2011 Census

Ethnic groups: 90.6% White, 4.2% Aboriginal, 1.4% South Asian 
Languages: 90.2% English, 2.2% French, 1.8% German, 1.1% Ukrainian
Religions: 67.3% Christian (26.8% Catholic, 10.0% United Church, 5.5% Lutheran, 4.2% Anglican, 2.3% Baptist, 1.6% Christian Orthodox, 1.5% Pentecostal, 15.4% Other), 30.6% No religion 
Median income (2010): $44,302 
Average income (2010): $60,210

Members of Parliament

This riding has elected the following members of the House of Commons of Canada:

Election results

References

Alberta federal electoral districts
Fort Saskatchewan
Sherwood Park